Maria Sergeeva may refer to:

Maria Sergejeva (born 1992), Russian-Estonian figure skater
Maria Sergeyeva (born 1985), Russian political activist and celebrity
Maria Sergeeva (gymnast) (born 2001), Russian rhythmic gymnast

See also
Sergeeva